Cyperus pacificus is a species of sedge that is native to north eastern parts of Asia.

See also 
 List of Cyperus species

References 

pacificus
Plants described in 1944
Flora of Japan
Flora of Korea